Konstantinos I. Logothetopoulos (1 August 1878 – 6 July 1961) was a distinguished Greek medical doctor who became Prime Minister of Greece, directing the Greek collaborationist government during the Axis occupation of Greece during World War II.

Early life
Logothetopoulos was born in Nafplion in 1878.

Education and Career
Logothetopoulos studied medicine in Munich and remained in the German Empire, practicing and teaching medicine until 1910, at which time he relocated to Athens. In Greece, he founded a private clinic and served in both the First Balkan War (1912–1913) and the  Second Balkan War (1913) as a doctor. He was discharged in 1916, resuming private medical practice until 1922 when he was again conscripted during the Greco-Turkish War to serve in the Army Hospital of Athens.

After the end of the war in 1922, Logothetopoulos became professor of gynaecology at the National and Kapodistrian University of Athens. Eventually he became Dean of the University. During his tenure at the university, he taught and assisted many young doctors in their studies including future politician Grigoris Lambrakis.

When Greece capitulated to Nazi Germany after the "Battle of Greece" during World War II, Logothetopoulos, who spoke the German language fluently and was married to the niece of Field Marshal Wilhelm List, was appointed Vice President and Minister of Education in the first collaborationist government of Gen. Georgios Tsolakoglou. After Tsolakoglou was removed from office, he served as Prime Minister between 2 December 1942 and 7 April 1943, when he was replaced by Ioannis Rallis.

When the Wehrmacht left Greece in 1944, Logothetopoulos went with them to Nazi Germany. Eventually he was captured by the United States Army which surrendered him to Greek authorities in 1946. He was tried and convicted of collaborating with the enemy and initially sentenced to life imprisonment, but was released in 1951.

Death
Logothetopoulos died in Athens on 6 July 1961.

References

1878 births
1961 deaths
20th-century prime ministers of Greece
20th-century Greek physicians
Prime Ministers of Greece
Greek collaborators with Nazi Germany
Greek fascists
Greek people of World War II
World War II political leaders
People convicted of treason against Greece
Greek prisoners sentenced to life imprisonment
Greek people who died in prison custody
Prisoners sentenced to life imprisonment by Greece
Prisoners who died in Greek detention
Academic staff of the National and Kapodistrian University of Athens
People from Nafplion
1942 in Greece
1943 in Greece
Greek anti-communists
Fascism in Greece